Chen Junyi (Cantonese: Chan4 Jeun3 Ngai6; born 26 August 1981 in Tianjin, China) is a Chinese baseball player who was a member of Team China at the 2008 Summer Olympics.  He is nicknamed "The Little Unit" due to his slender body and mullet that resembles Randy Johnson.

Sports career
1998 Guangdong Provincial Team;
2006 National Team

Major performances
2005 National Games - 5th;
2006/2007 National League - 2nd;
2006 National Championship - 4th

References
Profile 2008 Olympics Team China

1981 births
2009 World Baseball Classic players
Baseball players at the 2006 Asian Games
Baseball players at the 2008 Summer Olympics
Baseball players at the 2010 Asian Games
Baseball players from Tianjin
Living people
Olympic baseball players of China
Chinese baseball players
Asian Games competitors for China